A sensitive compartmented information facility (SCIF; pronounced ), in United States military, national security/national defense and intelligence parlance, is an enclosed area within a building that is used to process sensitive compartmented information (SCI) types of classified information.

SCIFs can be either permanent or temporary and can be set up in official government buildings (such as the Situation Room in the White House), on board ships, in private residences of officials, or in hotel rooms and other places of necessity for officials when traveling. Portable SCIFs can also be quickly set up when needed during emergency situations.

Access
Access to SCIFs is normally limited to those individuals with appropriate security clearances. Non-cleared personnel in SCIFs must be under the constant oversight of cleared personnel and all classified information and material removed from view to prevent unauthorized access. As part of this process, non-cleared personnel are also typically required to surrender all recording, photographic and other electronic media devices. All of the activity and conversation inside is presumed restricted from public disclosure.

Construction
Some entire buildings are SCIFs where all but the front foyer is secure. A SCIF can also be located in an air, ground or maritime vehicle, or can be established temporarily at a specific site.  The physical construction, access control, and alarming of the facility has been defined by various directives, including Director of Central Intelligence Directives (DCIDs) 1/21 and 6/9, and most recently (2011) by Intelligence Community Directive (ICD) 705, signed by the Director of National Intelligence. ICD 705 is a three-page capstone document that implements Intelligence Community Standard (ICS) 705-1, ICS 705-2 and the Technical Specifications for Construction and Management of Sensitive Compartmented Information Facilities or "Tech Specs."  The latest version of the Tech Specs was published in March 2020 (Version 1.5).

Computers operating within such a facility must conform to rules established by ICD 503.  Computers and telecommunication equipment within must conform to TEMPEST emanations specification as directed by a Certified TEMPEST Technical Authority (CTTA).

Officials documented to have had a SCIF set up in their private residences include:
 President George W. Bush at his Prairie Chapel Ranch in Crawford, Texas (which he used as his Western White House)
 Secretary of State Hillary Clinton at her Washington, D.C., home
 President Donald Trump at both Trump Tower in New York City, and at his Mar-a-Lago resort in Palm Beach, Florida

References

 Trish Choate (January 15, 2009). "Air Force planning to train hundreds yearly in cyber warfare skills".
 Patrick Thibodeau (February 12, 2008). "Outsourcing helps spur data center land rush outside D.C."

External links
 "Physical Security Standards for Sensitive Compartmented Information Facilities", DCID 6/9 Text; effective November 18, 2002. Retrieved 2010-07-19. (expired, only in use as grandfathering old facilities without updating)
 "Director of Central Intelligence Directive 6/3 Protecting sensitive compartmented information within information systems", MANUAL. n.d. Retrieved 2010-07-19.
 Definitions of SCIF-related terms SCIFsolutions.com. Retrieved 9 March 2017.
 
 "Director Signature and Technical Specifications for Construction and Management of Sensitive Compartmented Information Facilities." (April 2012).
 "Sensitive Compartmented Information Facility (SCIF) and Special Access Program Facility (SAPF) Criteria“ (March 2020).
 "SCIF Solutions: Provider of Next Generation SCIFs" (Since Oct 2004).
 "What is a SCIF" Adamosecurity.com (April 2019)

United States government secrecy
Rooms